União da Bola Futebol Clube, commonly known as União or União da Bola, is a Portuguese football club based in Funchal, Madeira. The club competes in the 6th tier Madeira 1st Division and plays its home games at the Campo do Adelino Rodrigues.

The club was founded in 2022 as a phoenix club of the former C.F. União, which folded in 2021 and were notable for their six appearances in the Portuguese top-flight Primeira Liga, most recently in the 2015–16 season. The new club was formed with the aim of "honouring the legacy" of the demised club.

History
The club was formed in August 2022, as a phoenix club following the demise of the former C.F. União, which was forcibly dissolved and officially closed on 23 November 2021. Uniao da Bola was founded by a committee in the form of Rómulo Soares Coelho, Hugo Valdemar Fernandes, Ruben Andrade, Tânia Abreu, Nuno Barros Sousa, André Gonçalves and Nuno Açafrão with the intention of fielding a senior team in the 1st Division of the Madeira Regional Championship, the sixth-tier level within the Portuguese football league system. On 8 September 2022, the club was officially registered with the Madeira Football Association, as club number 6103, and registered to the Regional Championship.

The club played its first competitive game on 12 November 2022, a 0–1 defeat away to Choupana FC, whilst one week later, on 19 November, União da Bola secured a historic first victory with a 1–0 win against C.F. Carvalheiro at Campo do Adelino Rodrigues; Rodrigo Gama scored the only goal of the game and the first goal in the history of the new club.

Stadium

União da Bola adopted the former home stadium of C.F. União, the Campo do Adelino Rodrigues, in the heart of Funchal city centre.

Managerial history

 Nuno Miguel Pinto Gomes (2022–)

Chairmen history

 To be announced

References

External links
 Official Profile at Facebook 
 Club Profile at ZeroZero 

C.F. União
Football clubs in Portugal
Association football clubs established in 2022
Sport in Madeira
2022 establishments in Portugal